The Great Comet of 1744, whose official designation is C/1743 X1, and which is also known as Comet de Chéseaux or Comet Klinkenberg-Chéseaux, was a spectacular comet that was observed during 1743 and 1744. It was discovered independently in late November 1743 by Jan de Munck, in the second week of December by Dirk Klinkenberg, and, four days later, by Jean-Philippe de Chéseaux. It became visible with the naked eye for several months in 1744 and displayed dramatic and unusual effects in the sky. Its absolute magnitude – or intrinsic brightness – of 0.5 was the sixth highest in recorded history. Its apparent magnitude may have reached as high as −7, leading it to be classified as a Great Comet. This comet is noted especially for developing a 'fan' of six tails after reaching its perihelion.

Discovery 

The comet was discovered on November 29, 1743, by Jan de Munck at Middelburg, and was independently sighted on December 9, 1743 by Klinkenberg at Haarlem, and by Chéseaux from the observatory at Lausanne on December 13.  Chéseaux said it lacked a tail and resembled a nebulous star of the third magnitude; he measured the coma as five minutes across.

The comet brightened steadily as it approached perihelion. By February 18, 1744, it reportedly was as bright as the planet Venus (with an apparent magnitude of −4.6) and at this time displayed a double tail.

Perihelion, "six tails" 

The comet reached perihelion about March 1, 1744, when it was 0.2 astronomical units from the Sun. At about this time it was bright enough to be observed in daylight with the naked eye. As it moved away from perihelion, a spectacular tail developed — extending well above the horizon while the comet's head remained invisible due to the morning twilight. In early March 1744, Chéseaux and several other observers reported an extremely unusual phenomenon — a 'fan' of six separate tails rose above the horizon.

The tail structure was a puzzle to astronomers for many years. Although other comets had displayed multiple tails on occasion, the 1744 comet was unique by having six. It has been suggested that the 'fan' of tails was generated by as many as three active sources on the cometary nucleus, exposed in turn to solar radiation as the nucleus rotated. It also has been proposed that the tail phenomenon was a very prominent example of the "dust striae" seen in the tails of some comets, such as Comet West and C/2006 P1 (McNaught).

Other observations 

Chéseaux, on March 9, was the last known observer in the northern hemisphere to see the comet, but it remained visible for observers in the southern hemisphere, some of whom reported a tail length of approximately 90 degrees on March 18. The comet was not seen after April 22, 1744.

The comet also was noted in Japanese astronomical records in the Nihon Odai Ichiran of the Kanpō era. Researchers have found in Chinese astronomical records that some Chinese observations describe audible sounds associated with the comet, which may, if true, have resulted from the interaction of particles with the Earth's magnetosphere, as sometimes described for the aurora.

Among those who saw the comet was the thirteen-year-old Charles Messier, on whom it had a profound and inspirational effect. He went on to become one of the founding figures of modern astronomy, and later discovered many comets during his observations.

Catherine the Great, then Sophia, also observed the brilliant comet as a young girl as she was travelling to Russia to be wed.

References

External links 
 Orbit Diagram, C/1743 X1 NASA Jet Propulsion Laboratory

Non-periodic comets
17431129
Great comets